WMSC may refer to:

WMSC (FM), a college radio station located in Upper Montclair, New Jersey, United States
FIA World Motor Sport Council
William Morris Society of Canada
Women's Missionary and Service Commission, a women's organization that originated out of the Mennonite Sewing Circle movement
Wrigley Marine Science Center, part of the USC Wrigley Institute for Environmental Studies